American film and television studios terminated production of black-and-white output in 1966 and, during the following two years, the rest of the world followed suit. At the start of the 1960s, transition to color proceeded slowly, with major studios continuing to release black-and-white films through 1965 and into 1966. Among the five Best Picture nominees at the 33rd Academy Awards in April 1961, two — [[Sons and Lovers (film)|Sons and Lovers]] and the winner, The Apartment, were black-and white. Two of the nominees in 1962 — The Hustler and Judgment at Nuremberg, were likewise black-and white. The pattern continued into 1963, with The Longest Day and To Kill a Mockingbird, into 1964, with America America and Lilies of the Field and into 1965, with Dr. Strangelove and Zorba the Greek.

At the 38th Academy Awards, held on April 18, 1966, the Best Picture winner (The Sound of Music) and one other nominee (Doctor Zhivago) were in color, but the remaining three nominees (Darling, Ship of Fools and A Thousand Clowns) were in black-and-white. However, at the 39th Academy Awards, held on April 10, 1967, the winner (A Man for All Seasons) and three other nominees (Alfie, The Russians Are Coming, the Russians Are Coming and The Sand Pebbles) were in color and only one nominee (Who's Afraid of Virginia Woolf?) was in black-and-white.

By the 40th Academy Awards, held on April 10, 1968, not only was the winner (In the Heat of the Night) and all four of the other nominees (Bonnie and Clyde, Doctor Dolittle, The Graduate and Guess Who's Coming to Dinner) in color but, since studios were no longer producing black-and-white films, the awards for Best Cinematography, Best Art Direction and Best Costume Design were merged into single categories rather than having a distinction between color and monochrome.

Transition
The transition to color started in earnest when NBC announced in May 1963 that a large majority of its 1964–65 TV season would be in color. By late September 1964, the move to potential all-color programming was being seen as successful and, on March 8, 1965, NBC confirmed that its 1965–66 season will be almost entirely in color. Three months later, on June 17, CBS, which had been limiting its color programming to only occasional specials, sent out a bulletin that it was preparing to broadcast at least 50 percent of its 1965–66 primetime programming in color.THE COLOR REVOLUTION: TELEVISION IN THE SIXTIES (Television Obscurities, April 26, 2018)

The move of American TV to color reached its final phase in February 1966 when the third network, ABC, announced plans for its 1966–67 season to be almost entirely in color. Since the premiere of NBC Saturday Night at the Movies in September 1961, post-1948 major studio feature films gained a dominant foothold in primetime American TV and, by the mid-1960s, feature films were being broadcast by all three networks in prime time on a nearly-daily basis. Although many of those films were in black-and-white, the ones that were presented in color on NBC, had been singled out for special promotion as "broadcast in living color".

In the aftermath of ABC's announcement, studios quickly surmised that only the color features in their film library will have TV broadcast value and stopped production of black-and-white films. Other than a very small number of major films that the studios were willing to publicize — The Fortune Cookie, Is Paris Burning?, Who's Afraid of Virginia Woolf?'' — completed or nearly completed black-and-white features were put into perfunctory release, but features that had been only partially completed were halted and ordered to restart in color. A similar situation had occurred 37 years earlier, in 1929, when studios stopped production on mid-completion silent films and ordered the addition of dialogue.

Since the 1970s, fiction feature films around the world have been filmed almost exclusively in color.  Some films after the transition to color are occasionally presented in black-and-white for budgetary or stylistic reasons. This is a list of notable feature films made after the 1960s that have a significant amount of their running time in black-and-white or monochrome/sepia tone. Many modern black-and-white films are shot in color and converted in post-production.

Note: This list does not include short films, documentaries, or films with black-and-white footage lasting less than 5 minutes.

1966

1967

1968

1969

1970s

1980s

1990s

2000s

2010s

2020s

Footnotes

References

 
Black and white
Black-and-white films produced since 1970